Satovcha Peak is the mostly ice-covered peak rising to 1587 m in Havre Mountains, northern Alexander Island in Antarctica.  It surmounts Bongrain Ice Piedmont to the northeast and Lennon Glacier to the southwest.  Its south slopes are precipitous and partly ice-free.  The vicinity was visited on 4 January 1988 by the geological survey party of Christo Pimpirev and Borislav Kamenov (First Bulgarian Antarctic Expedition), and Philip Nell and Peter Marquis (British Antarctic Survey).

The feature is named after the settlement of Satovcha in Southwestern Bulgaria.

Location

Maps
 British Antarctic Territory. Scale 1:200000 topographic map. DOS 610 – W 69 70. Tolworth, UK, 1971
 Antarctic Digital Database (ADD). Scale 1:250000 topographic map of Antarctica. Scientific Committee on Antarctic Research (SCAR). Since 1993, regularly upgraded and updated

Notes

References
 Bulgarian Antarctic Gazetteer. Antarctic Place-names Commission. (details in Bulgarian, basic data in English)
 Satovcha Peak. SCAR Composite Gazetteer of Antarctica

External links
 Satovcha Peak. Copernix satellite image

Mountains of Alexander Island
Bulgaria and the Antarctic